The 1972 Italian Open was a combined men's and women's tennis tournament that was played by men on outdoor clay courts at the Foro Italico in Rome, Italy. The men's and women's tournament were part of the 1972 Commercial Union Assurance Grand Prix. It was the 29th edition of the tournament and was held from 24 April through 2 May 1972. The singles titles were won by Manuel Orantes and Linda Tuero.

Finals

Men's singles
 Manuel Orantes defeated  Jan Kodeš 4–6, 6–1, 7–5, 6–2

Women's singles
 Linda Tuero defeated  Olga Morozova 6–4, 6–3

Men's doubles
 Ilie Năstase /  Ion Ţiriac defeated  Lew Hoad /  Frew McMillan 3–6, 3–6, 6–4, 6–3, 5–3, ret.

Women's doubles
 Lesley Hunt /  Olga Morozova defeated  Gail Chanfreau /  Rosalba Vido 6–3, 6–4

References

External links
 ITF tournament edition details

Italian Open
Italian Open
Italian Open
Italian Open (tennis)
Italian Open